Serbia  competed at the 2012 Winter Youth Olympics in Innsbruck, Austria. The Serbian team was made up of two athletes competing in two different sports.

Alpine skiing

Serbia qualified one boy in alpine skiing.

Boy

Biathlon

Serbia qualified one boy.

Boy

See also
Serbia at the 2012 Summer Olympics

References

2012 in Serbian sport
Nations at the 2012 Winter Youth Olympics
Serbia at the Youth Olympics